Macropsis is a genus of true bugs belonging to the family Cicadellidae. The genus was first described in 1834 by R.H. Lewis.

Species:
 Macropsis acrotirica
 Macropsis albae

References

Cicadellidae